Salicin is an alcoholic β-glucoside. Salicin is produced in (and named after) willow (Salix) bark.  It is a biosynthetic precursor to salicylaldehyde.

Medicinal aspects
Salicin is found in the bark of and leaves of willows,  poplars and various other plants. Derivates are found in castoreum. Salicin from  meadowsweet was used in the synthesis of aspirin (acetylsalicylic acid), in 1899 by scientists at Bayer. Salicin tastes bitter like quinine.

Salicin may cause an allergic skin reaction (skin sensitization; category 1).

Mild side effects are standard, with rare occurrences of nausea, vomiting, rash, dizziness and breathing problems. Overdose from high quantities of salicin can be toxic, damaging kidneys, causing stomach ulcers, diarrhea, bleeding or digestive discomfort. Some people may be allergic or sensitive to salicylates and suffer reactions similar to those produced by aspirin. People should not take salicin if they have asthma, diabetes, gout, gastritis, hemophilia, stomach ulcers; also contraindicated are children under 16, and pregnant and breastfeeding women.

References 

Bitter compounds
Natural phenols
Phenol glucosides